Kenora—Rainy River was a federal electoral district represented in the House of Commons of Canada from 1925 to 2004. It was located in the province of Ontario. This riding was created in 1924 from parts of Fort William and Rainy River and Port Arthur and Kenora ridings.

It initially consisted of the parts of the territorial districts of Kenora and Rainy River lying west of the fifth meridian passing between the townships of Melgund and Revell.

In 1933, it was redefined as consisting of the part of the province of Ontario lying west of the fourth meridian including Sioux Lookout, Ignace and Atikokan.

In 1966, it was redefined as consisting of the western parts of the territorial districts of Rainy River and Kenora west of a line drawn (from south to north) beginning at the Duluth, Winnipeg and Pacific Railway bridge and ending at the northern limit of the province.

In 1976, it was redefined as consisting of the western parts of the Territorial Districts of Kenora, Rainy River and Thunder Bay.

The electoral district was abolished in 2003. Rainy River was merged with Thunder Bay—Atikokan to form Thunder Bay—Rainy River, while the rest of the riding became Kenora.

Members of Parliament

This riding has elected the following Members of Parliament:

Election results

  
|}

|}

Acceptance by Mr. Heenan of an office of emolument under the Crown, October 11, 1926:
 

|}

|}

On Mr. Heenan's resignation and on his election to the Legislative Assembly of Ontario, July 10, 1934:

|}

|}

|}

|}

|}

|}

|}

|}

|}

|}

|}

|}

|}

|}

|}

|}

|}

|}

|}

|}

|}

See also 

 List of Canadian federal electoral districts
 Past Canadian electoral districts

External links 
Riding history from the Library of Parliament

Former federal electoral districts of Ontario
1924 establishments in Ontario
2003 disestablishments in Ontario